Senator Morehead may refer to:

James Turner Morehead (Kentucky politician) (1797–1854), U.S. Senator from Kentucky
James Turner Morehead (North Carolina politician) (1799–1875), North Carolina State Senate
John H. Morehead (1861–1942), Nebraska State Senate

See also
Tom Van Horn Moorehead (1898–1979), Ohio State Senate